The Shops at La Cantera is an open-air regional shopping mall located in La Cantera, San Antonio, near the Texas State Highway Loop 1604 and Interstate 10 interchange, on the city's Northwest Side. The initial phase of the project opened on September 16, 2005. The  center sits on a  site in La Cantera, a  master-planned resort community developed by USAA Real Estate Company. La Cantera is also home to Six Flags Fiesta Texas, La Cantera Resort & Spa and two world-class golf courses, The Palmer Course at La Cantera and the Resort Course, which was home to the PGA Valero Texas Open. The anchor stores are Neiman Marcus, Nordstrom, Dillard's, Macy's, Barnes & Noble, and H&M.

Design
The concept for the center was originally developed and conceived by The Rouse Company under a joint venture with USAA Real Estate Company. (The Rouse Company also developed San Antonio's North Star Mall.) General Growth Properties acquired The Rouse Company in November 2004.

Local architectural firm Alamo Architects designed The Shops at La Cantera, constructed as a single-level, garden-like "retail village" with varied storefronts, shared arcades, and subtle water features. The overall architectural style of the center has a Texas Hill Country vernacular vibe designed to ease environmental concerns about land usage and nature conservation. The shops reflect the preservation of natural landscape and evolution in modern shopping patterns. Austin-native J. Robert Anderson, FASLA conceived the landscape architecture style, that also reflects Hill Country.

The Shops at La Cantera includes the first Neiman Marcus and Nordstrom in San Antonio and new stores from Dillard's and Foley's (now Macy's). There are also more than 150 other shops and restaurants.

The second phase of the mall was opened in October 2008 and had 300,000 new square feet of retail space and contained an additional 40 stores (about 30 of which are new to the market), restaurants, a large bookstore, and Class A office space. Like the original mall, the second phase was designed by Alamo Architects.

Awards
Superior Achievement in Design & Imaging (SADI) 2006 Grand Award Winner

References

External links

Shopping malls in San Antonio
Brookfield Properties
Shopping malls established in 2005
2005 establishments in Texas